Caml is a dialect of the ML programming language.

CAML may also refer to:

 Calcium modulating ligand
 Canadian Association of Music Libraries, Archives and Documentation Centres
 Census of Antarctic Marine Life, a field project of the Census of Marine Life
 Collaborative Application Markup Language

See also
 Camel (disambiguation)
 OCaml